John Joseph O'Connor may refer to:
 John O'Connor (cardinal), archbishop of New York
 John J. O'Connor (bishop of Newark), American prelate of the Catholic Church.
 John J. O'Connor (New York representative), U.S. Representative from New York
 John J. O'Connor (journalist), American journalist and critic
 Jack O'Connor (catcher), utility player in Major League Baseball

See also
 John O'Connor (disambiguation)